The Ambassador of Italy to the United Kingdom is the Italy's foremost diplomatic representative in the United Kingdom, and head of the Italy's diplomatic mission in the United Kingdom. The official title of the Italian Ambassador to the Court of St James's is Ambasciatore d'Italia al Regno Unito. On the basis of the Vienna Convention on Diplomatic Relations of 18 April, 1961, the embassy’s functions include the following:
 Represent Italy in the United Kingdom of Great Britain and Northern Ireland;
 Safeguard the interests of Italy and its citizens, within the limits set by international law;
 Negotiate with the government of the United Kingdom of Great Britain and Northern Ireland;
 Gather information, by any legal means, on conditions and events in the United Kingdom and report back to the Italian State;
 Promote friendly relations and develop economic, cultural and scientific collaborations between Italy and the United Kingdom.

Heads of mission

Ambassadors   
 2018-present: Raffaele Trombetta
 2013-2018: Pasquale Terracciano
 2010-2013: Alain Giorgio Maria Economides
 2004-2009: Giancarlo Aragona
 1999-2004: Luigi Amaduzzi
 1995-1999: Paolo Galli
 1991-1995: Giacomo Attolico
 1987-1991: Boris Biancheri
 1985-1987: Bruno Bottai
 1980-1985: Andrea Cagiati
 1975-1980: Roberto Ducci
 1968-1975: Raimondo Manzini
 1964-1968: Gastone Guidotti
 1961-1964: Pietro Quaroni
 1955-1961: Vittorio Zoppi
 1952-1954: Manlio Brosio
 1947-1951: Tommaso Gallarati Scotti
 1944-1947: Nicolò Carandini
 1939-1940: Giuseppe Bastianini
 1932-1939: Dino Grandi
 1927-1932: Antonio Chiaramonte Bordonaro
 1922-1927: Pietro Tomasi Della Torretta
 1921-1922: Giacomo De Martino
 1910-1920: Guglielmo Imperiali
 1906-1910: Antonino di San Giuliano
 1906-1906: Tommaso Tittoni
 1901-1906: Alberto Pansa
 1898-1900: Francesco De Renzis
 1895-1898: Annibale Ferrero
 1889-1894: Giuseppe Tornielli
 1888-1888: Carlo Felice di Robilant
 1886-1888: Luigi Corti
 1883-1885: Costantino Nigra
 1876-1882: Luigi Federico Menabrea
 1869-1875: Carlo Cadorna
 1861-1868: Vittorio Emanuele Taparelli d'Azeglio

References

External links 
 Italy and UK, esteri.it

United Kingdom
Italy